A total solar eclipse will occur on January 5, 2057. A solar eclipse occurs when the Moon passes between Earth and the Sun, thereby totally or partly obscuring the image of the Sun for a viewer on Earth. A total solar eclipse occurs when the Moon's apparent diameter is larger than the Sun's, blocking all direct sunlight, turning day into darkness. Totality occurs in a narrow path across Earth's surface, with the partial solar eclipse visible over a surrounding region thousands of kilometres wide.

Related eclipses

Solar eclipses 2054–2058

Saros series 142

Tritos series

Metonic series

References

External links 
 NASA graphics

2057 01 05
2057 in science
2057 01 05
2057 01 05